The Bruschghorn is a mountain of the Lepontine Alps, overlooking Thalkirch (Safien) in the Swiss canton of Graubünden. With a height of 3,056 metres above sea level, the Bruschghorn is the culminating point of the range lying between the Safiental and the Domleschg valley.

See also
List of mountains of Graubünden
List of most isolated mountains of Switzerland

References

External links
 Bruschghorn on Hikr

Mountains of the Alps
Alpine three-thousanders
Mountains of Switzerland
Mountains of Graubünden
Lepontine Alps
Safiental
Muntogna da Schons